The  Kansas City Chiefs season was the franchise's 24th season in the National Football League  and the 34th overall. They improved on their 10–6 record from 1992 and won the AFC West and with an 11–5 record. Kansas City advanced all the way to the AFC Championship before losing to the Buffalo Bills 30–13, which started the Chiefs' NFL record 8-game playoff losing streak. It would be 22 years before the Chiefs would win another playoff game, and 25 years until they won another playoff game at Arrowhead.

The season marked the first for new quarterback Joe Montana, who was acquired through a trade with the San Francisco 49ers and running back Marcus Allen from the Los Angeles Raiders, both winners of five Super Bowl championships combined. This would be the last time until 2018 that the Chiefs would appear in the AFC Championship game or win a playoff game at Arrowhead.

Offseason

Montana and Marcus
Kansas City acquired two Super Bowl MVPs with one fell swoop--Joe Montana from the San Francisco 49ers and Marcus Allen.  Allen arrived from Kansas City's most hated rival, the Los Angeles Raiders, in a move still talked about today when discussing football's most heated rivalry.  Leading into the 1993 season, the Chiefs had not only a proven passer, but also a proven running game to complement their already powerful defense.

The previous season, the Chiefs' starting quarterback was Dave Krieg and their running back was Christian Okoye.  Okoye suffered a knee injury prior to training camp in 1993, but keeping Krieg would prove to be a wise decision in the event of injury to the new starter Montana.

Allen was named NFL Comeback Player of the Year in 1993 after rushing for twelve touchdowns and 764 yards.

NFL draft

With their first pick in the 1993 NFL draft, coming in the third round, the Chiefs' selected future all-pro and Hall of fame guard Will Shields out of the University of Nebraska. Shields went on to start 223 of the 224 career games he played for the team and was selected to 12 consecutive Pro Bowls.

Personnel

Staff

Roster

Preseason

Regular season

Schedule

Note: Intra-division opponents are in bold text.

Game summaries

Week 1: at Tampa Bay Buccaneers

Week 2: at Houston Oilers

Week 3: vs. Denver Broncos

Week 5: vs. Los Angeles Raiders

Week 6: vs. Cincinnati Bengals

Week 7: at San Diego Chargers

Week 9: at Miami Dolphins

Week 10: vs. Green Bay Packers

Week 11: at Los Angeles Raiders

Week 12: vs. Chicago Bears

Week 13: vs. Buffalo Bills

Week 14: at Seattle Seahawks

Week 15: at Denver Broncos

Week 16: vs. San Diego Chargers

Week 17: at Minnesota Vikings

Week 18: vs. Seattle Seahawks

Standings

Postseason

Schedule

Game summaries

AFC Wild Card Playoffs: vs. (6) Pittsburgh Steelers

Chiefs kicker Nick Lowery made the winning 32-yard field goal after 11:03 of overtime. The Steelers scored first on tight end Adrian Cooper's 10-yard touchdown reception from quarterback Neil O'Donnell. Kansas City then tied the game after backup quarterback Dave Krieg, who temporarily replaced injured starter Joe Montana, threw a 23-yard touchdown to wide receiver J.J. Birden. However, Pittsburgh scored 10 unanswered points in the second quarter: kicker Gary Anderson's 30-yard field goal and O'Donnell's 26-yard touchdown completion to wide receiver Ernie Mills. After Lowery made a 23-yard field goal in the third quarter, the Chiefs eventually tied the game in the fourth period with running back Marcus Allen's 2-yard touchdown. However, the Steelers marched 74-yards to take the lead on O'Donnell's third touchdown pass of the game, a 22-yard score to tight end Eric Green. In the final minutes of regulation, Keith Cash blocked a Pittsburgh punt and Fred Jones returned it to the Steelers 9-yard line. On fourth down, wide receiver Tim Barnett scored on a 7-yard touchdown reception from Montana to tie the game. Then after forcing Pittsburgh to punt, Kansas City drove 47 yards to set up Lowery's 43-yard field-goal attempt in the closing seconds, but the kick was wide right and thus the game went into overtime.  Montana finished the game with 276 passing yards and a touchdown, with no interceptions.

AFC Divisional Playoffs: at (2) Houston Oilers

Chiefs quarterback Joe Montana threw three touchdown passes in the second half to give his team a 28–20 win. The Oilers jumped to a 10–0 lead in the first quarter with kicker Al Del Greco's 49-yard field goal and running back Gary Brown's 2-yard touchdown. Then after a scoreless second period, Montana threw a 7-yard touchdown pass to tight end Keith Cash in the third quarter. In the fourth period, Del Greco kicked a 43-yard field goal to give Houston a 13–7 lead. But aided by a 38-yard pass interference penalty, the Chiefs advanced 71 yards to score on wide receiver J.J. Birden's 11-yard touchdown reception from Montana. On the Oilers' next possession, Kansas City defensive lineman Dan Saleaumua recovered a fumble by Houston quarterback Warren Moon, setting up Montana's 18-yard touchdown pass to wide receiver Willie Davis. The Oilers then drove 80 yards to score on wide receiver Ernest Givins' 7-yard touchdown catch, but the Chiefs responded with running back Marcus Allen's game-clinching 21-yard touchdown run that capped off a 79-yard drive. The Oilers had 1:51 left to score but failed on a 4th down attempt on their own 20 yard line. This would be the Chiefs' last playoff win until the 2015 season.

AFC Championship: at (1) Buffalo Bills

Running back Thurman Thomas led the Bills to the 30–13 victory by recording 186 rushing yards, 3 receptions for 22 yards, and three touchdowns. Buffalo scored first on Thomas' 12-yard touchdown run before Chiefs kicker Nick Lowery kicked two field goals. In the second quarter, Thomas scored on a 3-yard touchdown and Bills kicker Steve Christie made two field goals to extend the lead 20–6. With 21 seconds left in the first half, the Chiefs reached the Buffalo 5-yard line, but quarterback Joe Montana's pass was intercepted by Bills defensive back Henry Jones. Montana later suffered a concussion during the third play of the third quarter and left the game. Kansas City backup quarterback Dave Krieg then led his team on a 90-yard drive to score on running back Marcus Allen's 1-yard touchdown. However, Buffalo scored 10 unanswered points in the final period, an 18-yard field goal by Christie and a 3-yard touchdown by Thomas, to preserve the victory.

References

External links
1993 Kansas City Chiefs on Database Football

1993 Kansas City Chiefs season
Kansas City Chiefs
AFC West championship seasons
Kansas